Lieutenant colonel William Hulme (10 May 1788 – 21 August 1855) was an officer of the 96th Regiment of Foot, British Army.

Early years
William Browne Hulme was born at Halifax, Nova Scotia on 10 May 1788. He was educated at King's College, Windsor, Halifax, Nova Scotia.

Career
Upon leaving college, Hulme received a commission as ensign in the newly raised Nova Scotia Fencibles on 23 September 1803.

West Indies
The first and second battalions of the 1st Regiment (Royal Scots) had been stationed in the West Indies since 1803. Hulme joined the regiment with the rank of lieutenant on 26 June 1805, but his service in North America soon came to an end on 17 December 1805. A substantially reduced second battalion returned to England in January 1806 to news of the revolt of two Sepoy battalions employed by the East India Company at Vellore and of other troubles. The battalion was immediately ordered to India, reinforced to 1000 men with volunteers from the third and fourth battalions stationed at Bexhill.

New Zealand

Flagstaff War
William Hulme's military career was most notable for his part in the Flagstaff War, also known as the First Anglo-Māori War, which took place in New Zealand between 1845 and 1846. As Brevet Lieutenant Colonel he commanded the colonial forces during the attack on Heke's pā at Puketutu (sometimes called Te Mawhe Pā) on the shores of Lake Ōmāpere. In May 1845 Heke's pā was attacked by troops from the 58th, 96th and 99th Regiments with marines and a Congreve rocket unit.

The colonial forces arrived at Heke's pā at Puketutu on 7 May 1845. Lieutenant Colonel Hulme and his second in command Major Cyprian Bridge made an inspection of Heke's pā and found it to be quite formidable. Lacking any better plan they decided on a frontal assault the following day. Te Ruki Kawiti and his warriors attacked the colonial forces as they approached the pā, with Heke and his warriors firing from behind the defences of the pā. There followed a savage and confused battle. Eventually the discipline and cohesiveness of the British troops began to prevail and the Māori were driven back inside the pā. But they were by no means beaten, far from it, as without artillery the British had no way to overcome the defences of the pā. Hulme decided to disengage and retreat back to the Bay of Islands. Hulme returned to Auckland, and from the arrival of additional troops in June 1845, was superseded in command of the forces in New Zealand by Lieutenant Colonel Henry Despard, 99th Regiment, a soldier who did very little to inspire any confidence in his troops.

Later life
In 1846 he purchased a house in Parnell, Auckland, which became and is still known as Hulme Court. While not open to the public, this is on the New Zealand Historic Places register and is one of the oldest documented houses in Auckland still standing.

Tasmania
Based in Hobart, Van Diemen's Land, with his troops, since arrival of the ship Java on 19 December 1846, Hulme advanced from Brevet Lieutenant Colonel to Lieutenant Colonel without purchase in 1848. He then retired from soldiering in 1849 and moved back to New Zealand.

New Zealand

Legislative Council
In July 1849, Governor George Grey, appointed Hulme to member of the General Legislative Council. That year, Hulme introduced the  idea of a motion and ordinance in favour of enabling Maori land in the northern district of New Zealand to be used for cattle grazing by squatting. "Nothing, he thought, would tend so much to the general good and welfare of New Zealand as the opening up of its lands to the occupation of European settlers and squatters." In response: "The Governor said that the resolution as it now stood could not be entertained by the Council—but he thought that they might readily adopt a different one, which might answer the ends aimed at, and be less objectionable. As it stood he could not advise its adoption, for this reason that it involved a question that was one of universal interest for the whole of New Zealand, South as well as North; and although the General Legislative Council of the whole islands had power vested in it to adopt resolutions on this subject, yet as this Council did not represent the whole islands, it could not entertain a subject affecting the entire country."

Post Office
Hulme was appointed by Governor George Grey as the first Postmaster for the Province of Auckland from 1 January 1854 but received less support in the idea of an appointment to Postmaster-General for New Zealand.

Death
William Hulme died on Tuesday, 21 August 1855, in his 68th year and was buried with military honours in Symonds Street Cemetery on Friday, 24 August. The New-Zealander wrote:

The late Lieut. Col. Hulme was a fine specimen of a thorough English soldier; intrepid and cool on all occasions.

In 1849 he sold out of the service, and returned to Auckland, where to the hour of his death, he was all along held in the highest estimation as an upright and honourable colonist.

References

1788 births
1855 deaths
Pre-Confederation Nova Scotia people
University of King's College alumni
Royal Scots officers
Royal Fusiliers officers
96th Regiment of Foot officers
British military personnel of the Third Anglo-Maratha War
British military personnel of the New Zealand Wars
Flagstaff War
Members of the New Zealand Legislative Council (1841–1853)
Burials at Symonds Street Cemetery